The year 2012 in art involves some significant events.

Events
 January – Isabella Stewart Gardner Museum extension in Boston, Massachusetts, designed by Renzo Piano Building Workshop, is opened
 February – Extension to Städel art gallery in Frankfurt, Germany, designed by schneider+schumacher, scheduled for opening
 March – The Palm Springs Art Museum opens a satellite museum in Palm Desert
 March – The Jerwood Gallery in Hastings opens
 March – A large trove of art is discovered in Munich, part of which was looted by the Nazis. German authorities only acknowledge the discovery after press reports in November 2013
 March 29 – Refurbished and renamed Museum of Contemporary Art Australia, Sydney, with new Mordant Wing designed by Sam Marshall, opened
 May 1 – One of four versions of The Scream by Edvard Munch sells at Sotheby's in New York City for $119.9 million including the buyer's commission, the most ever paid for a work of art at auction
 May 10 – God Speed by Edmund Leighton is sold to a private collector through Sotheby's in London
 May 11 – ArcelorMittal Orbit sculpture and observation tower ( tall) in Olympic Park, London, designed by Anish Kapoor with Cecil Balmond and Ushida Findlay Architects, unveiled
 May 29 – Tate Britain announces that it has received a donation of nine works of art dating from the 1960s–90s from the private collection of Mercedes and Ian Stoutzker
July 17 - Odalisque in Red Pants by Henri Matisse which was stolen off the wall at the Contemporary Art Museum of Caracas in the capital city  of Venezuela and replaced with a forgery inside of its  former frame is recovered in an FBI sting operation in Miami, Florida.
 July 18 – Tate Modern, London, opens The Tanks performance art/installation space, refurbished by Herzog & de Meuron
 July 27
 08:12 – Martin Creed's Work No 1197: All the bells in a country rung as quickly and as loudly as possible for three minutes is performed across the United Kingdom to mark the opening of the 2012 Summer Olympics
 21:00 – Performance of Isles of Wonder, the 2012 Summer Olympics opening ceremony in London directed by Danny Boyle, begins
 August 12 – Damien Hirst's representation of the British Union Flag forms the arena centrepiece for the 2012 Summer Olympics closing ceremony in London. Es Devlin is designer for the ceremony and the creative director and choreographer is Kim Gavin
 September - The Museo Alameda in San Antonio, Texas, U.S.A. closes 
 September 21 – Islamic art gallery at the Musée du Louvre in Paris, designed by Mario Bellini and Rudy Ricciotti, opens
 September 23 – Renovation and new wing for Stedelijk Museum Amsterdam, designed by Benthem Crouwel Architekten, opened to public
 September 27 – The "Isleworth Mona Lisa" is unveiled to the public for the first time in 40 years
 October 1 (National Day of the People's Republic of China) – China Art Museum and the Power Station of Art open in the former China pavilion at Expo 2010 in Shanghai to house exhibitions of contemporary Chinese art
 November – The auction house Sotheby's removes Cady Noland's piece Cowboys Milking (1990) from their contemporary sale after the artist "disavows" the work. Both Noland and the auction house are then sued by the piece's owner, gallerist Marc Jancou for twenty six million dollars (with twenty million being sought from Noland and six from Sotheby's) but a judge dismisses Jancou's lawsuit
 December 11 – Le Louvre-Lens, a branch museum of the Musée du Louvre, designed by SANAA, opens in the French city of Lens, Pas-de-Calais, a former centre of coal mining

Exhibitions
 To January 9 – "de Kooning: A Retrospective" at the Museum of Modern Art, New York
 To February 5 – "Leonardo da Vinci, Painter at the Court of Milan" at the National Gallery, London
 To February 12 – "Johann Zoffany RA: Society Observed" at the Yale Center for British Art, New Haven, Connecticut (then at the Royal Academy, London from March 10 to June 10)
 January 21 until April 9 – "David Hockney: A Bigger Picture" at the Royal Academy, London
 February 1 until May 6 – "Van Gogh Up Close" at the Philadelphia Museum of Art
 February 9 until May 27 – "Lucian Freud Portraits" at the National Portrait Gallery, London
 February 11 until April 1 "Three From Cuba: The Art of Vicente, Miguel and Sandro - The Fantastic to the Sublime" (Vicente Hernandez, Sandro de la Rosa, Miguel Florido)  at the Appleton Museum of Art in Ocala, Florida.
 February 15 until May 27 - "Van Dyck in Sicily" at the Dulwich Picture Gallery in Dulwich, South London, England.
 February 15 until July 15 – "Picasso & Modern British Art" at Tate Britain, London (then at Scottish National Gallery of Modern Art, Edinburgh from August 4 until November 4)
 March 13 until July 1 – "Degas et le Nu" at the Musée d'Orsay, Paris
 March 14 until June 5 – "Turner Inspired in the Light of Claude" at the National Gallery, London
 From March 15 – "Rodin to Now: Modern Sculpture" at the Palm Springs Art Museum, Palm Desert
April 4 until July 20 - "The Ideal City: The Renaissance Utopia at Urbino between Piero della Francesca and Raphael” at the Galleria Nazionale delle Marche in Urbino, Italy
 April 4 until September 9 – "Damien Hirst" at Tate Modern, London
 From April 7 until July 29 - "Fracture: Daido Moriyama" at the Los Angeles County Museum of Art, curated by Edward Robinson.
 From June 9 until September 2 – Picturing the South, photographs by Martin Parr, Kael Alford, and Shane Lavalette
 From June 28 until October 14 – "Edvard Munch: The Modern Eye" at Tate Modern, London
 From August 18 – "India: Art Now" at the Arken Museum of Modern Art, Copenhagen
 From September 9 – "Arte Povera: The Great Awakening" at the Kunstmuseum Basel
 From September 12 – "Pre-Raphaelites: Victorian Avant-Garde" at Tate Britain, London
 From September 15 until December 9 – "Bronze" at the Royal Academy, London
 From September 16 – "Ken Price Sculpture: A Retrospective" at the Los Angeles County Museum of Art
 From September 18 – "Regarding Warhol: Sixty Artists, Fifty Years" at the Metropolitan Museum of Art, New York
 From September 20 until November 18 – "Discovering Columbus" by Tatzu Nishi at Columbus Circle in New York City, New York
 From September 28 – "Paul Gauguin: The Prints" at the Kunsthaus Zürich
 From October 5 – "Picasso Black and White" at the Solomon R. Guggenheim Museum, New York
 From October 10 – "Richard Hamilton: The Late Works" at the National Gallery, London
 From October 13 – "Seduced by Art: Photography Past and Present" at the National Gallery, London
 From November 15 – "George Bellows" at the Metropolitan Museum of Art, New York
 From November 18 – "Tokyo 1955–1970: A New Avant-Garde" at the Museum of Modern Art New York City, New York
 From December 4 – "Matisse: In Search of True Painting" at the Metropolitan Museum of Art, New York

Works

 El Anatsui – "Broken Bridge ll" (pressed tin and broken mirrors) along the High Line on the western wall between west 21st street and west 22nd street in Manhattan, New York City.
 David Kimball Anderson - "Hydrogen snd Nitrogen" (sculpture)
 Julius von Bismarck and Julian Charrière - "Some Pigeons are more Equal than Others" executed at the Venice Biennale of Architecture and then in Copenhagen
 Monica Bonvicini – Run (installation in Olympic Park, London)
 David Breuer-Weil – Alien (sculpture)
 Berlinde De Bruyckere - "We are All Flesh" (sculpture)
 Carlos Cruz-Diez – "Double Induction in a Chromatic Frequency" mosaic tiled walkways at Marlins Park in Miami, Florida
 Anya Gallaccio – The Light Pours Out of Me (installation)
 Annie Han and Daniel Mihalyo – Inversion: Plus Minus (sculpture, Portland, Oregon)
 Ralph Heimans – Portrait of Queen Elizabeth II
 Damien Hirst – Verity (20.25 m (66 ft) bronze statue of a pregnant woman holding a sword aloft, erected at Ilfracombe, England, October 17)
 Celia Paul – Painter and Model (self-portrait)
 John Howard Sanden – Laura Welch Bush
 Jud Turner – Great Blue Heron (sculpture, Eugene, Oregon)
 Danh Vo - I M U U R 2'x
 Henry Weber - Statue of Tony DeMarco in the North End neighborhood of Boston, Massachusetts

Awards
 Archibald Prize - Tim Storrier for "The Histrionic Wayfarer (after Bosch) (Self portrait)"
 Artes Mundi Prize - Teresa Margolles
 Henry Hope Reed Award for classical art and design – Elizabeth Barlow Rogers
 Hugo Boss Prize – Danh Vo
 John Moores Painting Prize -  Sarah Pickstone for "Stevie Smith and the Willow"

FilmsAi Weiwei: Never SorryGirl With Black BalloonsMark Lombardi - Death-Defying Acts of Art and Conspiracy''

Deaths
 January 1
 Jan Groover, 68, American photographer
 Hermann Guggiari, 87, Paraguayan sculptor
 January 3 – Winifred Milius Lubell, 97, American illustrator and writer
 January 4 – Eve Arnold, 99, American photographer
 January 19 – Peter de Francia, 90, French-English painter and illustrator
 January 31
 Mike Kelley (body found on this date), 57, American artist and musician (Destroy All Monsters)
 Dorothea Tanning, 101, American surrealist painter, printmaker, and sculptor.
 February 3 – Jorge Glusberg, 79, Argentine author and director of the Museo Nacional de Bellas Artes MNBA
 February 6
 Yasuhiro Ishimoto, 91, Japanese-American photographer
 Antoni Tàpies, 88, Spanish painter, sculptor and art theorist.
 February 8- Theophilus Brown, 92, American painter
 February 18 – Matt Lamb, 79, American painter
 February 24 – Kenneth Price, 77, American ceramicist, sculptor
 March 8 – Minoru Mori, 77, Japanese founder of the Mori Art Museum
 March 16 – Anita Steckel, 82, American feminist artist
 March 27 – Hilton Kramer, 84, American art critic
 April 2 – Elizabeth Catlett, 96, American born Mexican sculptor and printmaker
 April 6 – Thomas Kinkade, 54, American painter
 April 9 
 Richard Beyer, 86, American sculptor
 John Golding, 82, British artist, art scholar and curator
 April 12 – John Weaver, 92, Canadian sculptor
 April 19 - Enrico Pedrini, 72, Italian academic, theorist, and art collector
 April 25- Louis le Brocquy, 95, Irish painter
 April 27 – David Weiss (Fischli & Weiss), 65, Swiss artist
 May 2 -  Bram Bogart, 90, Dutch born Belgian painter
 May 11 – Tony DeZuniga, 79, Filipino illustrator 
 May 15 – George Wyllie, 90, Scottish artist
 May 30 – Barton Lidice Beneš, 69, American artist
 June 9 – Paul Jenkins, 88, American painter
 June 10 – Georges Mathieu, 91, French painter
 June 20 – LeRoy Neiman, 91, American painter
 June 22 – Mary Fedden, 96, British painter
 June 28 – Ivan Karp, 86, American art dealer
 July 22 – Herbert Vogel, 89, American art collector
 July 25 – Franz West, 65, Austrian painter and sculptor
 July 26 – Karl Benjamin, 86, American painter
 July 28 – Adam Cullen, 46, Australian painter
 August 6 – Robert Hughes, 74, Australian-born art critic
 August 9 – Jan Sawka, 65, Polish-born American artist and architect
 August 21 – Hans Josephsohn, 92, German-born Swiss sculptor
 September 8 – Mario Armond Zamparelli, 81, American artist and designer
 September 11 – Tony Goldman, 68, American real estate developer, art impresario, and preservationist
 September 14 – Don Binney, 72, New Zealand painter
 September 29 – Mark Wiener, 61, American painter
 October 6 – Raoul De Keyser, Belgian painter
 October 11 – Edgar Negret, 92, Colombian sculptor
 October 15 - Michael Asher, 69, American conceptual artist 
 October 30 – Lebbeus Woods, 72,  American artist and architect
 November 13 – Will Barnet, 101, American painter
 November 16 – William Turnbull, 90, Scottish artist
 November 17 – Arnaud Maggs, 86, Canadian artist and photographer
 December 15 – Jeffrey Potter, 94, writer, authored a biography of Jackson Pollock
 December 20 – Robert Juniper, 83, Australian artist
 December 29 – Edward Meneeley, 85, American painter, sculptor and printmaker

References

 
 
2010s in art
Years of the 21st century in art